The 2013 Arkansas–Pine Bluff Golden Lions football team represents the University of Arkansas at Pine Bluff in the 2013 NCAA Division I FCS football season. The Golden Lions are led by sixth year head coach Monte Coleman and play their home games at Golden Lion Stadium as a member of the West Division of the Southwestern Athletic Conference (SWAC). They came into the 2013 season as the defending SWAC Champions.

Media
Every Golden Lions football games will be broadcast on KUAP 89.7 FM. Select games will also air on various ESPN Networks and Comcast.

Schedule

^Game aired on a tape delayed basis

References

Arkansas-Pine Bluff
Arkansas–Pine Bluff Golden Lions football seasons
Arkansas-Pine Bluff Golden Lions f